Ervin Hasalliu (born 6 January 1989) is an Albanian football player. He plays as a midfielder for Shkumbini Peqin football club in Albania's Second Division.

References

1989 births
Living people
Footballers from Kavajë
Albanian footballers
Association football midfielders
KF Butrinti players
KS Iliria players
KS Burreli players
Besa Kavajë players
KS Shkumbini Peqin players
Kategoria e Parë players
Kategoria e Dytë players